Operalnia was an opera house in Warsaw in Poland, built in 1725 and torn down in 1772. It was situated in the Saxon Garden. It was the first public opera theater in Poland.

History
It was constructed by the order of Augustus II and modelled after the small court theater of Dresden from 1687. Prior to the Operalnia, opera and theater had only been performed in Poland at the private royal court theatres. 

The opera house was finnally inaugurated in 1748. It was the first public opera in Poland. Foreign (mostly Italien and French) opera, ballet and theater was performed on the stage of the Operalnia. 

In 1765, the National Theatre, Warsaw was inaugurated in the Operalnia opera house. The theater shared the building with opera and ballet for several years. 

The building was deemed no longer sufficient in 1772 and torn down. The National Theatre as well as the opera was moved to the Radziwiłł Palace at the Krakowskie Przedmieście and in 1778 to a building at the Krasiński square, where it was to remain until 1833.

References 

 Źródło: Słownik Biograficzny Teatru Polskiego 1765-1965, PWN Warszawa 1973

Opera in Poland
1748 establishments
1772 establishments
18th-century establishments in Poland
18th-century disestablishments in Poland
Opera houses in Poland
18th century in Warsaw